John Peck (August 1922 – 28 March 2004) was a British communist politician, known for contesting a large number of elections before finally winning one.

Early life
Born in Caistor in Lincolnshire, Peck grew up in Scunthorpe and was educated at Scunthorpe Grammar School.  He flew with the Royal Air Force during World War II and won the Distinguished Flying Cross.  Inspired both by experience of postings in Calcutta and the American Deep South, and also an uncle who was an active communist, he joined the Communist Party of Great Britain (CPGB) in 1944.

Political activism
After the war, Peck worked in the steel industry and became an active trade unionist.  He first stood for election for the CPGB in 1946, taking only 146 votes for the Scunthorpe seat on Lindsey County Council.  In 1948, he moved to Nottingham to take up a full-time post for the CPGB area committee, and in 1955 began regularly contesting the Bulwell ward for Nottingham City Council.  He also contested Nottingham North at the 1955 general election, the first of ten unsuccessful attempts to win the seat.  In his election campaigns, Peck often used photographs of himself in his RAF uniform, wearing his medals, something which proved controversial with other CPGB members.

Peck became a well-known figure in Nottingham, and in the 1960 film Saturday Night and Sunday Morning, he is shown speaking to a meeting at the gates of a factory.  He served as first secretary, then president, of the Bulwell Tenants Association, and during the 1970s he was vice-president and president of the Nottingham Trades Council.

During the 1980s, Peck served as national election agent to the CPGB, briefly as acting national organiser, and eventually was elected to the CPGB's executive committee.  However, he increasingly came into conflict with other local members, becoming one of the few supporters of the Eurocommunist leadership in the area.

Electoral success
In 1987, Peck finally won the seat of Bulwell East, at his 36th attempt.  From 1988 to 1990, with the remainder of the council consisting of an equal number of Labour Party and Conservative Party members, Peck effectively held the casting vote, generally siding with Labour, but voting against them to prevent a reorganisation of council departments.

In 1990, with the CPGB on the verge of dissolution, Peck defected to the Green Party of England and Wales, for which he held his seat at three further elections, until he retired in 1997.  In total, he contested 49 elections at various levels, a record acknowledged by the Guinness Book of Records.

Retirement
Peck published an autobiography in 2001, entitled Persistence, while leading the Nottingham Pensioners' Action Group.  He died in 2004 after suffering ill health.

References

1922 births
2004 deaths
British World War II pilots
Communist Party of Great Britain councillors
Green Party of England and Wales councillors
Nottingham City Councillors
People from Caistor
Recipients of the Distinguished Flying Cross (United Kingdom)
People from Scunthorpe
Military personnel from Lincolnshire
Royal Air Force personnel of World War II
Royal Air Force officers